Daniel Tudin (born August 3, 1978) is a Canadian-born Italian professional ice hockey player. He is currently playing in Italy with Ritten Sport of the Serie A.

Amateur career
Tudin played major junior hockey in the Ontario Hockey League with the Ottawa 67's. He then played college hockey with Dalhousie University before turning professional with the 2003–04 Columbus Cottonmouths of the ECHL.

Career statistics

Awards and honours

References

External links

1978 births
Living people
Canadian ice hockey left wingers
Columbus Cottonmouths (ECHL) players
Ice hockey people from Ottawa
Las Vegas Wranglers players
Omaha Ak-Sar-Ben Knights players
Ottawa 67's players
Ritten Sport players
Canadian expatriate ice hockey players in Italy